Çifte Minareli Medrese is an architectural monument of the late Seljuk period in Erzurum City, Erzurum Province, Turkey. Built as a theological school a few years before 1265, it takes its name, Twin Minaret Madrasa, from the two fluted minarets that crown the monumental façade.

History
The Çifte Minareli Medrese is thought to be the model for the Gök Medrese in Sivas. According to the inscription on the portal, it was built in 1271 by Khudavand Khatun, the daughter of Seljuq Sultan Kayqubad I. The madrasa probably had an impact on the Buruciye Madrasa too.

The east entrance of the madrasa and the enormous stone facade of ornamental brick and tile masonry with two minarets are remarkable works of art.

On each side of the entrance there is a panel. The right side is decorated with a double-headed eagle. The motif on the left side does not seem to be completed.

References

External links

Various photos of Çifte Minareli Medrese
Official Tour Agency

Buildings and structures completed in 1265
Buildings and structures of the Sultanate of Rum
Buildings and structures in Erzurum
Madrasas in Turkey
World Heritage Tentative List for Turkey